Mao Jingdian (born 27 February 1995) is a Chinese para table tennis player. She won the gold medal in the women's individual C8 event at the 2012 Summer Paralympics and the same event at the 2016 Summer Paralympics. She also represented China at the 2020 Summer Paralympics in Tokyo, Japan and won the gold medal in the women's individual C8 event. 

She has won numerous titles at the Asia and Oceania Championships (in 2009 and 2011), Asian Para Games (in 2010, 2014 and 2018) and the Asian Championships (in 2017 and 2019).

Mao was a table tennis prodigy before her disability. She represented her home province Jiangsu in national competitions in 2005, when she was 10 years old. However, later that year, an injury and a misdiagnosis caused a dislocated hip, which forced her retirement. She began playing seriously again after meeting para table tennis coach Yuan Feng in 2009.

References

External links 
 

Living people
1995 births
People from Taixing
Table tennis players from Jiangsu
Paralympic medalists in table tennis
Table tennis players at the 2012 Summer Paralympics
Table tennis players at the 2016 Summer Paralympics
Table tennis players at the 2020 Summer Paralympics
Medalists at the 2012 Summer Paralympics
Medalists at the 2016 Summer Paralympics
Chinese female table tennis players
Paralympic table tennis players of China
Paralympic gold medalists for China
Shandong Normal University alumni
20th-century Chinese women
21st-century Chinese women